Saint-Alban (Gallo: Saent-Alban) is a commune in the Côtes-d'Armor department of Brittany in northwestern France.

Population

People from Saint-Alban are called albanais in French.

See also
 Communes of the Côtes-d'Armor department

References

External links

 

Communes of Côtes-d'Armor